() is the Canadian national motto. The phrase comes from the Latin Vulgate translation of Psalm 72:8 in the Bible:

""(King James Bible: "He shall have dominion also from sea to sea, and from the river unto the ends of the earth").

History

The first recorded use of the phrase to represent Canada was by George Monro Grant, who was Sandford Fleming's secretary and a Presbyterian minister who used the phrase in his sermons. His great-grandson Michael Ignatieff suggests that Grant used the phrase in a nation-building effort during the construction of the Canadian Pacific Railway. The use of the word "dominion" in the verse reflected the common use of the name "Dominion of Canada" for the new country.

The motto was first officially used in 1906 on the head of the mace of the new Legislative Assembly of Saskatchewan. This phrase was suggested for a national motto by Joseph Pope, then-Under Secretary of State, when the Canadian coat of arms was redesigned in 1921. Pope was a member of the four-person committee appointed by the federal government to redesign the coat of arms (the other members were Thomas Mulvey, A.G. Doughty and Major-General W.G. Gwatkin). No motto had been included in the original design. Major-General W.G. Gwatkin proposed "In memoriam in spem" ("In memory, in hope") as a motto, but Pope's proposal garnered more support. The draft design was approved by Order in Council on April 21, 1921, and by the Royal Proclamation of King George V on November 21, 1921.

As part of the Canadian coat of arms, the motto is used as a mark of authority by various government agencies and representatives. It is also present on all denominations of Canadian banknotes, and on the cover of Canadian passports. On its own, it appears on all federal government proclamations.

Proposed amendment

In March 2007, the premiers of Canada's three territories called for the amendment of the motto to reflect the vast geographic nature of Canada's territory, as Canada has coastlines on the Arctic, Atlantic, and Pacific Oceans. The expanded informal version of the motto ("from sea to sea to sea") is used in speeches and writings about Canada, representing inclusiveness toward northern residents and the growing significance of the Arctic in Canada's political and economic future. A Canwest Global-commissioned poll showed proponents of amending the motto outnumbering opponents in the ratio of three to one, with one-third of those polled neutral.

See also

Great Seal of Canada
National symbols of Canada
List of Canadian provincial and territorial symbols
List of national mottos

References

Latin mottos
National symbols of Canada
National mottos
Hebrew Bible words and phrases